Quarantine is a medical term for the act of keeping an object in enforced isolation for a period of time to limit or prevent the spread of disease or infection. 

Quarantine may also refer to:

Medicine and disease
Cordon sanitaire, isolation of a geographic region to prevent transmission of disease beyond the region
Isolation (health care), isolation of infected to prevent transmission of disease
Biocontainment, isolation of medical samples of infected tissues and disease agents

Government and law
An alternative term for a naval blockade, particularly associated with the United States' "quarantine" of Cuba during the Cuban Missile Crisis of late 1962
A grace period of 40 days during which a widow has the right to remain in her dead husband's home, regardless of the inheritance 
Quarantine Speech, a 1937 speech by U.S. President Franklin Delano Roosevelt
COVID-19 community quarantines in the Philippines, a set of community quarantines during the COVID-19 pandemic in the Philippines

Films
Quarantined (film), a 1970 US television film
Quarantine (1923 film), a 1923 German silent film
Quarantine (1983 film), a 1983 Soviet children's film
Quarantine (2008 film), a 2008 US science fiction horror film
Quarantine 2: Terminal, a 2011 US science fiction horror film, sequel to the 2008 film
Quarantine (2021 film), a 2021 Russian dystopian drama film

Literature
Quarantine (Egan novel), a 1992 science fiction novel by Greg Egan
Quarantine (Crace novel), a 1997 novel by Jim Crace
Quarantine (poem), a poem by Eavan Boland about the Irish famine

Music
Quarantine, a 2010 album by GRITS
Quarantine (Laurel Halo album), 2012
"Quarantine", a 2017 song by Flobots from Noenemies
"Quarantine" (Blink-182 song), a 2020 single

Television
"Quarantine" (Red Dwarf), a 1992 episode of the British sci-fi comedy Red Dwarf
"Quarantine" (Stargate Atlantis), a fourth-season episode of the sci-fi series Stargate Atlantis
"Quarantine" (The Twilight Zone), a 1986 episode of the television series
"Quarantine" (TUGS episode), the fifth episode of TUGS
"Quarantine", a 1976 episode of The Onedin Line
"Quarantine", an episode of The Good Doctor
"Quarantine", an episode of Zoey 101

Other uses
Quarantine (video game), a 1994 video game for the 3DO and IBM PC systems
Quarantine (antivirus program), a 1989 antivirus program
In grants of indulgences, the term Quarantines means an ecclesiastical penance of 40 days

See also

 
 
Sanitorium, medical isolation facility
Biosafety level